Talai is a town and a nagar panchayat in Bilaspur district in the Indian state of Himachal Pradesh.

Demographics
 India census, Talai had a population of 2010 of which males constituted 53% and females 47%. The town's average literacy rate of 71% is higher than the national average of 59.5%: male literacy is 75%, and female literacy is 68%. In Talai, 15% of the population is under 6 years of age.
There are three temples dedicated to Baba Balak Nath. It has four schools, three hospitals, a police station, a cricket ground (under construction), four banks and two ATM. Although there is no bus stop, the town has a dozen small hotels and restaurants along with more than 100 Shops.

References

Cities and towns in Bilaspur district, Himachal Pradesh